Kingsley Stream is a tributary of the River Slea that lies in Hampshire, England. It joins the Oakhanger Stream by Kingsley Mill, south of the village. It is regarded by the Environment Agency as the headwaters of the Slea.

References

Rivers of Hampshire
1Kingsley